Al Maya Group is a Dubai based retail chain in UAE and operates supermarkets all over GCC countries, with around 40 outlets in UAE alone.

Foundation
The Al Maya Group in the Middle East commenced its business operations with a stand-alone supermarket in Ajman in the late 1970s.  In 1981 the Group was refurbished by its new partner and Chairman, Mr Lachmandas. K. Pagrani. Thereafter the Group set up 18 stores in the next 18 months. Al Maya Flagship has 56 Supermarkets in GCC. As part of providing better solutions and services, a wholesale foodstuff division was created to supply the UAE and neighboring countries.

The Al Maya Group further diversified into the wholesale of textiles, followed by novelties, households, garments and electronics. In 1985, the Group acquired the prestigious British Home Stores (BHS) franchise for the Northern Emirates.  Again in year 2006 Al Maya group signed franchise agreement with BORDERS group for entire GCC.

References 

Companies based in Dubai